Edward Bentall may refer to:
 Edward Bentall, chairman of Bentalls department store
 Edward Bentall (footballer) (1923–1947), English footballer
 Edward Hammond Bentall (1814–1898), English manufacturer and politician